Choida Jamtsho (17 March 1965 — 18 April 2021) was a Bhutanese politician who had been a member of the National Assembly of Bhutan, since October 2018. Previously, he was a member of the National Assembly of Bhutan from 2008 to 2013 and again from 2013 to 2018.

Education
He was educated at Sherubtse College, Bhutan (Bachelor of Commerce, 1989) and the University of East Anglia (MSc Environmental Sciences, 2006).

Political career
He was elected to the National Assembly of Bhutan as a candidate of DPT from Nganglam constituency in 2008 and 2013 elections.

He was re-elected to the National Assembly of Bhutan as a candidate of DPT from Nganglam constituency in 2018 Bhutanese National Assembly election. He received 3576 votes and defeated Karma Dorji, a candidate of DNT.

Jamtsho died in April 2021 from food poisoning.

References

1965 births
2021 deaths
Sherubtse College alumni
Alumni of the University of East Anglia
21st-century Bhutanese politicians
Druk Phuensum Tshogpa politicians
Bhutanese politicians
Bhutanese MNAs 2008–2013
Bhutanese MNAs 2013–2018
Bhutanese MNAs 2018–2023
Druk Phuensum Tshogpa MNAs